Herbert H. Shaw (February 16, 1930–) was an American independent politician, a prominent perennial candidate from North Bergen, New Jersey who has run for office more than 75 times over five decades as an Independent under the "Politicians Are Crooks" banner. Over the years, Shaw has run for United States Senator, U.S. House of Representatives, State Senator, Assemblyman, Hudson County Executive, Hudson County Sheriff, Hudson County Freeholder, North Bergen Commissioner, and the North Bergen Board of Education.  He never received as much as 5% of the vote.  "My motive is revenge," Shaw told a reporter in 2011.

His most recent campaign was in 2014, when he challenged Congressman Albio Sires.  He received 921 votes, 1.5%.

He ran for the United States Senate in 1978, finishing third in a field of seven candidates, running more than 1 million votes behind the winner, Bill Bradley.  He received 4,736 votes, a little less than one-quarter of one percent.

Shaw has run against six Congressmen: Henry Helstoski, Harold Hollenbeck, Frank Guarini, Robert Torricelli, Bob Menendez, and Albio Sires.

In 2012, he went to public meeting of the North Bergen Board of Commissioners to complain that police had not yet located a bathtub stolen from his backyard. He said the backyard of his house "is packed with junk, including a rusty school bus, old tires, several cars, an unused van, tables, and a variety of other items." Shaw: "I'm one of the original hunter gatherers. Call me a hoarder, collector, whatever you want, but I have a lot of antiques."

Shaw died around January 2016.

References

1930 births
2010s deaths
Year of death uncertain
New Jersey Independents
People from North Bergen, New Jersey